Aichi 7th district (愛知県[第]7区, Aichi-ken-[dai-]nanaku) is a single-member constituency of the House of Representatives, the lower house of the national Diet of Japan. It covers the commuter and industrial towns northeast of Nagoya. The district consists of the cities of Ōbu, Owariasahi, Toyoake, Nisshin, Nagakute, Aichi District and parts of Seto City. As of 2016, 448,591 eligible voters were registered in the district.

The district is currently represented by Junji Suzuki from Liberal Democratic Party.

Background 
The commuter and industrial towns surrounding Nagoya have long been regarded as a bastion for anti-LDP forces and this district is no exception. The 7th district and its predecessors have continuously elected non-LDP members to the Diet. After the introduction of parallel voting and single-member districts in 1996, the district has only elected one LDP member, Junji Suzuki, who was elected in the LDP landslides of 2005, 2012, and 2021.

List of representatives

Election results

References 

Aichi Prefecture
Districts of the House of Representatives (Japan)